This is a list of some Asian leaders and politicians, with a commitment to the Japanese cause, in the Yen Block or Greater Asian Co-Prosperity Sphere Pan-Asian economic associations previous to and during the Pacific War period, between 1931–1945.

Empire of Manchukuo
Puyi, the Kangde Emperor (Monarch and Head of State)
Zheng Xiaoxu (Prime Minister of Manchukuo) 
Zhang Jinghui (next Prime Minister until 1945)

Jewish Far East Community in Manchukuo
Dr.Abraham Kaufman (Local Harbin Zionist anticommunist leader)

Chōsen
Crown Prince Euimin (Yi Eun) (Korean Imperial House chief and local leader)
Prince Imperial Ui (Gyn Rhee) (Korean Imperial House chief and supporter)

White Russians Community in Manchukuo
Konstantin Vladimirovich Rodzaevsky  (White Russian anticommunist leader)
General Kislitsin (another White Russian anti-Soviet chief)
General Vrashevsky (White Russian anti-Stalinist leader, also Japanese follower)

Reformed Government of the Republic of China and the Wang Jingwei regime
President Liang Hongzhi (Head of State of the Reformed Government) 
President Wang Jingwei (First Head of state of the Wang Jingwei regime)
President Chen Gongbo (Second Head of State of the Wang Jingwei regime)

Mengjiang
Demchugdongrub (Head of State)

Malaya
Sultan Ibrahim of Johor (local Malay Islamic leader)
Sultan Musa Ghiatuddin Riayat Shah of Selangor (local Malay Islamic leader)
Ibrahim Hj Yaacob - founder of Kesatuan Melayu Muda

Second Philippine Republic
José P. Laurel (President of the Japanese inaugurated Republic)
Emilio Aguinaldo (former Philippine president, also supported Japanese cause for sometime)

Dutch East Indies-Indonesia
Sukarno (native Indonesian Nationalist leader)
Mohammad Hatta  (local Indonesian Nationalist leader, with Sukarno as Dwitunggal)
Radjiman Wediodiningrat (native Indonesian Islamic politic)

French Indochina
Admiral Jean Decoux (Vichy French governor)

Empire of Vietnam
Emperor Bảo Đại (Vietnamese Head of State)
Trần Trọng Kim  (Local Vietnamese leader)
Trinh Minh The  (Vietnamese nationalist and military leader)

Kingdom of Kampuchea (Cambodia)
Norodom Sihanouk (Cambodian Head of State)
Son Ngoc Thanh (Native Cambodian leader)

Kingdom of Laos
Prince Phetxarāt (Laotian Political Chief)

Thailand
Field Marshal Plaek Phibunsongkhram (Head of Government and military strongman)
 Prince Wan Waithayakon (Diplomat and propagandist)

State of Burma
Ba Maw (local Burmese chief, and Head of State)
U Aung San (local Burmese supporter for certain period)
Bo Ne Win (native Burmese military supporter)

Arzi Hukumat-e-Azad Hind (Free India) 
Subhas Chandra Bose (legendary Indian Freedom Struggle Hero. Head of State of Provisional Government of Free India)
A. M. Sahay (another Indian leader and Japanese political follower)
Rash Behari Bose (Indian pro-Japanese leader)
Habib Hassan (Indian pro-Japanese leader)

Afghanistan
Sardar Mohammad Hashim Khan (native Afghan Islamic leader)

First East Turkestan Republic
Muhammad Amin Bughra (Emir)

References

Leaders in the Japanese sphere of influence (1931-1945)
East Asian people
Japanese military occupations